Relish is an American cooking, food, and lifestyle magazine, website, and cooking show founded in 2006. Each month, the magazine features articles on cooking, dining, recipes, and entertaining.

The magazine is published by New York City and Nashville-based PGoA Media.

Editors
 Jill Melton (2006–present)

References

External links
 Official site

Lifestyle magazines published in the United States
Monthly magazines published in the United States
Food and drink magazines
Magazines established in 2006
Mass media in Nashville, Tennessee
Magazines published in New York City
Southern Progress Corporation
Magazines published in Tennessee